The following highways are numbered 432:

Canada
 Manitoba Provincial Road 432
 Newfoundland and Labrador Route 432

Japan
 Japan National Route 432

United States
  Montana Secondary Highway 432
  New York State Route 432 (former)
 New York State Route 432 (former)
  Puerto Rico Highway 432
 Texas:
  Texas State Highway Loop 432 (former)
  Farm to Market Road 432
 Virginia State Route 432 (former)
  Washington State Route 432
  Wyoming Highway 432